The Phillipi House, also known as the Mastin House, is a historic residence in Mobile, Alabama, United States.  The two-story brick masonry structure was completed in 1850.  It is built in a traditional Mobile townhouse style with a Greek Revival door surround and a second floor cast iron balcony across the front elevation.  It was added to the National Register of Historic Places on January 5, 1984, based on its architectural significance.

References

National Register of Historic Places in Mobile, Alabama
Houses on the National Register of Historic Places in Alabama
Houses in Mobile, Alabama
Houses completed in 1850
Federal architecture in Alabama
Greek Revival houses in Alabama